Yoann Bellot Sover (born February 20, 1980) is a French actor and television presenter primarily known as one of the most prolific dubbing artist in the French-speaking world having lent his voice to over a hundred mainstream international productions. Sover is the regular voice of numerous actors such as Zac Efron, Chad Michael Murray, Jackson Rathbone, Dave Franco, Drew Fuller or Ben Whishaw. In gaming, his voice credits include Hayner in Kingdom Hearts II (2005), Spider-Man in Disney Infinity 2.0 (2014), Otta Baseballson in Assassin's Creed Valhalla (2020) or Bala-Tik in Lego Star Wars : The Skywalker Saga (2022). He was also the voice of numerous advertising campaigns and vocal guidance for leading brands such as l'Oréal, Disney, Disneyland Paris, Hasbro, Lego, Paco Rabanne, Orange, Carrefour, Spotify, Monopoly, Rimmel or even the French national postal service La Poste. As of 2023, as a thespian, Sover appeared in 15 stage productions, 4 feature films and over 20 television productions.

Biography

Acting

Theatre

Cinema

Television

Dubbing

Cinema

Television

Animated series

Gaming 

 2006 : Kingdom Hearts II : Hayner
 2014 : Disney Infinity 2.0 : Spider-Man
 2020 : Watch Dogs: Legion : the voice on the radio.
 2020 : Assassin's Creed Valhalla : Otta Baseballson.
 2021 : Ratchet and Clank: Rift Apart : additional voices.
 2022 : Dying Light 2 Stay Human : additional voices.
 2022 : Horizon Forbidden West : additional voices.
 2022 : Lego Star Wars : The Skywalker Saga : Bala-Tik & additional voices.
 2022 : Cookie Run: Kingdom : Milk Cookie.

See also 

 Dubbing in France

References

External links 

 Partial voiceography at Doublagissimo!
 

1980 births
Living people
French television presenters
French male voice actors
Video game actors
French stage actors